An iron lung is a type of negative pressure ventilator (NPV), a mechanical respirator which encloses most of a person's body, and varies the air pressure in the enclosed space, to stimulate breathing. It assists breathing when muscle control is lost, or the work of breathing exceeds the person's ability. Need for this treatment may result from diseases including polio and botulism and certain poisons (for example, barbiturates, tubocurarine).

The use of iron lungs is largely obsolete in modern medicine, as more modern breathing therapies have been developed, and due to the eradication of polio in most of the world. However, in 2020, the COVID-19 pandemic revived some interest in the device as a cheap, readily-producible substitute for positive-pressure ventilators, which were feared to be outnumbered by patients potentially needing temporary artificially assisted respiration.

Design and function

The iron lung is typically a large horizontal cylinder, in which a person is laid, with their head protruding from a hole in the end of the cylinder, so that their full head (down to their voice box) is outside the cylinder, exposed to ambient air, and the rest of their body sealed inside the cylinder, where air pressure is continuously cycled up and down, to stimulate breathing.

To cause the patient to inhale, air is pumped out of the cylinder, causing a slight vacuum, which causes the patient's chest and abdomen to expand (drawing air from outside the cylinder, through the patient's exposed nose or mouth, into their lungs). Then, for the patient to exhale, the air inside the cylinder is compressed slightly (or allowed to equalize to ambient room pressure), causing the patient's chest and abdomen to partially collapse, forcing air out of the lungs, as the patient exhales the breath through their exposed mouth and nose, outside the cylinder.

Examples of the device include the Drinker respirator, the Emerson respirator, and the Both respirator. Iron lungs can be either manually or mechanically powered but normally are powered by an electric motor linked to a flexible pumping diaphragm (commonly opposite the end of the cylinder from the patient's head). Larger "room-sized" iron lungs were also developed, allowing for simultaneous ventilation of several patients (each with their heads protruding from sealed openings in the outer wall), with sufficient space inside for a nurse or a respiratory therapist to be inside the sealed room, attending the patients.

Smaller, single-patient versions of the iron lung include the so-called cuirass ventilator (named for the cuirass, a torso-covering body armor). The cuirass ventilator encloses only the patient's torso, or chest and abdomen, but otherwise operates essentially the same as the original, full-sized iron lung. A lightweight variation on the cuirass ventilator is the jacket ventilator or poncho or raincoat  ventilator, which uses a flexible, impermeable material (such as plastic or rubber) stretched over a metal or plastic frame over the patient's torso.

Method and use

Humans, like most mammals, breathe by negative pressure breathing: the rib cage expands and the diaphragm contracts, expanding the chest cavity. This causes the pressure in the chest cavity to decrease, and the lungs expand to fill the space. This, in turn, causes the pressure of the air inside the lungs to decrease (it becomes negative, relative to the atmosphere), and air flows into the lungs from the atmosphere: inhalation. When the diaphragm relaxes, the reverse happens and the person exhales. If a person loses part or all of the ability to control the muscles involved, breathing becomes difficult or impossible.

Invention and early use

Initial development

In 1670, English scientist John Mayow came up with the idea of external negative pressure ventilation. Mayow built a model consisting of bellows and a bladder to pull in and expel air.
The first negative pressure ventilator was described by British physician John Dalziel in 1832. Successful use of similar devices was described a few years later. Early prototypes included a hand-operated bellows-driven "Spirophore" designed by Dr Woillez of Paris (1876), and an airtight wooden box designed specifically for the treatment of polio by Dr Stueart of South Africa (1918). Stueart's box was sealed at the waist and shoulders with clay and powered by motor-driven bellows.

Drinker and Shaw tank

The first of these devices to be widely used however was developed in 1928 by Drinker and Shaw of the United States. The iron lung, often referred to in the early days as the "Drinker respirator", was invented by Philip Drinker (1894–1972) and Louis Agassiz Shaw Jr., professors of industrial hygiene at the Harvard School of Public Health. The machine was powered by an electric motor with air pumps from two vacuum cleaners. The air pumps changed the pressure inside a rectangular, airtight metal box, pulling air in and out of the lungs.
The first clinical use of the Drinker respirator on a human was on October 12, 1928, at the Boston Children's Hospital in the US. The subject was an eight-year-old girl who was nearly dead as a result of respiratory failure due to polio. Her dramatic recovery, within less than a minute of being placed in the chamber, helped popularize the new device.

Variations
Boston manufacturer Warren E. Collins began production of the iron lung that year. Although it was initially developed for the treatment of victims of coal gas poisoning, it was most famously used in the mid-20th century for the treatment of respiratory failure caused by poliomyelitis.

Danish physiologist August Krogh, upon returning to Copenhagen in 1931 from a visit to New York where he saw the Drinker machine in use, constructed the first Danish respirator designed for clinical purposes. Krogh's device differed from Drinker's in that its motor was powered by water from the city pipelines. Krogh also made an infant respirator version.

In 1931, John Haven Emerson (1906–1997) introduced an improved and less expensive iron lung. The Emerson iron lung had a bed that could slide in and out of the cylinder as needed, and the tank had portal windows which allowed attendants to reach in and adjust limbs, sheets, or hot packs. Drinker and Harvard University sued Emerson, claiming he had infringed on patent rights. Emerson defended himself by making the case that such lifesaving devices should be freely available to all. Emerson also demonstrated that every aspect of Drinker's patents had been published or used by others at earlier times. Since an invention must be novel to be patentable, prior publication/use of the invention meant it was not novel and therefore unpatentable. Emerson won the case, and Drinker's patents were declared invalid.

The United Kingdom's first iron lung was designed in 1934 by Robert Henderson, an Aberdeen doctor. Henderson had seen a demonstration of the Drinker respirator in the early 1930s and built a device of his own upon his return to Scotland. Four weeks after its construction, the Henderson respirator was used to save the life of a 10-year-old boy from New Deer, Aberdeenshire, who had poliomyelitis. Despite this success, Henderson was reprimanded for secretly using hospital facilities to build the machine.

Both respirator

The Both respirator, a negative pressure ventilator, was invented in 1937 when Australia's epidemic of poliomyelitis created an immediate need for more ventilating machines to compensate for respiratory paralysis. Although the Drinker model was effective and saved lives, its widespread use was hindered by the fact that the machines were very large, heavy (about 750 lbs or 340 kg), bulky, and expensive. In the US, an adult machine cost about $2000 in 1930, and £2000 delivered to Melbourne in 1936. The cost in Europe in the mid-1950s was around £1500. Consequently, there were few of the Drinker devices in Australia and Europe.

The South Australia Health Department asked Adelaide brothers Edward and Don Both to create an inexpensive "iron lung". Biomedical engineer Edward Both designed and developed a cabinet respirator made of plywood that worked similarly to the Drinker device, with the addition of a bi-valved design which allowed temporary access to the patient's body. Far cheaper to make (only £100) than the Drinker machine, the Both Respirator also weighed less and could be constructed and transported more quickly. Such was the demand for the machines that they were often used by patients within an hour of production.

Visiting London in 1938 during another polio epidemic, Both produced additional respirators there which attracted the attention of William Morris (Lord Nuffield), a British motor manufacturer and philanthropist. Nuffield, intrigued by the design, financed the production of approximately 1700 machines at his car factory in Cowley, and donated them to hospitals throughout all parts of Britain and the British Empire. Soon, the Both-Nuffield respirators were able to be produced by the thousand at about one-thirteenth the cost of the American design. By the early 1950s, there were over 700 Both-Nuffield iron lungs in the United Kingdom, but only 50 Drinker devices.

Polio epidemic 

Rows of iron lungs filled hospital wards at the height of the polio outbreaks of the 1940s and 1950s, helping children, and some adults, with bulbar polio and bulbospinal polio. A polio patient with a paralyzed diaphragm would typically spend two weeks inside an iron lung while recovering.

Modern development and usage
Polio vaccination programs have virtually eradicated new cases of poliomyelitis in the developed world. Because of this, and the development of modern ventilators, and widespread use of tracheal intubation and tracheotomy, the iron lung has mostly disappeared from modern medicine. In 1959, 1,200 people were using tank respirators in the United States, but by 2004 that number had decreased to just 39.

By 2014, only 10 people were left with an iron lung.

Replacement 
Positive pressure ventilation systems are now more common than negative pressure systems. Positive pressure ventilators work by blowing air into the patient's lungs via intubation through the airway; they were used for the first time in Blegdams Hospital, Copenhagen, Denmark, during a polio outbreak in 1952. It proved a success and soon superseded the iron lung throughout Europe.

The iron lung now has a marginal place in modern respiratory therapy. Most patients with paralysis of the breathing muscles use modern mechanical ventilators that push air into the airway with positive pressure. These are generally efficacious and have the advantage of not restricting patients' movements or caregivers' ability to examine the patients as significantly as an iron lung does.

Continued use 
Despite the advantages of positive ventilation systems, negative pressure ventilation is a truer approximation of normal physiological breathing and results in a more normal distribution of air in the lungs. It may also be preferable in certain rare conditions, such as central hypoventilation syndrome, in which failure of the medullary respiratory centers at the base of the brain results in patients having no autonomic control of breathing. At least one reported polio patient, Dianne Odell, had a spinal deformity that caused the use of mechanical ventilators to be contraindicated.

At least a few patients today still use the older machines, often in their homes, despite the occasional difficulty of finding replacement parts.

Joan Headley of Post-Polio Health International said that as of May 28, 2008, about 30 patients in the U.S. were still using an iron lung. That figure may be inaccurately low; Houston alone had 19 iron lung patients living at home in 2008.

Martha Mason of Lattimore, North Carolina died on May 4, 2009, after spending 60 of her 72 years in an iron lung.

On October 30, 2009, June Middleton of Melbourne, Australia, who had been entered in the Guinness Book of Records as the person who spent the longest time in an iron lung, died aged 83, having spent more than 60 years in her iron lung.

In 2013, the Post-Polio Health International (PHI) organizations estimated that only six to eight iron lung users were in the United States; as of 2017 its executive director knew of none. Press reports then emerged, however, of at least three (perhaps the last three) users of such devices, sparking interest amongst those in the makerspace community such as Naomi Wu in the manufacture of the obsolete components, particularly the gaskets. One is retired lawyer Paul Alexander, 77, of Dallas.

In 2021, the National Public Radio programs Radio Diaries and All Things Considered gave a report on Martha Lillard, one of the last two Americans depending on the daily use of an iron lung, which she had been using since 1953. In her audio interview, she reported that she was having problems obtaining replacement parts to keep her machine working properly.

COVID-19 pandemic 
In early 2020, reacting to the COVID-19 pandemic, to address the urgent global shortage of modern ventilators (needed for patients with advanced, severe COVID-19), some enterprises developed prototypes of new, readily-producible versions of the iron lung. These developments included:
 a compact, torso-sized "exovent" developed by a team in the United Kingdom, which included the University of Warwick, the Royal National Throat Nose and Ear Hospital, the Marshall Aerospace and Defence Group, the Imperial College Healthcare NHS Trust, along with teams of medical clinicians, academics, manufacturers, engineers and citizen scientists;
 a full-size iron lung developed in the United States by a team led by Hess Services, Inc., of Hays, Kansas.

See also
 Negative pressure ventilator
 Mechanical ventilator
 Respirator 
 Positive pressure ventilation
 Respiratory therapist

References

Bibliography
 
 Martha Mason, a polio survivor, penned a best-selling memoir, Breath, about her life inside an iron lung.
 Margaret Atwood mentions an iron lung in her book Cat's Eye
 Peg Kehret mentions the use of an iron lung in her autobiographical book, Small Steps: The Year I Got Polio
 Elizabeth Berg shares a fictionalization of the true story of Pat Raming, the first woman to give birth to a baby while in an iron lung, in her book, We are All Welcome Here. 2006.
 Respiration Without Breathing – about the Thunberg "barospirator" built by John Emerson.
 "A medical triumph: The iron lung", January–February 1979 Respir Ther., 9(1):71–73, on PubMed, NCBI, National Institutes of Health

External links

 "Iron Lung." Claude Moore Health Sciences Library, University of Virginia
 Both respirator at the Powerhouse Museum

Medical pumps
Polio
Respiratory therapy
1928 introductions
Mechanical ventilation